S.C.Moitra Air Technical Training Institute , established in 1948, is oldest Aircraft Maintenance Engineering College in India.  Late Mr. Subodh Chandra Moitra established and started this college in 1948 as a Coaching Centre for Ground Maintenance Engineers.

About college
The Institute holds its name primarily as the first ever institute in Asia to give training in the field of Aircraft maintenance. Initially, Mr. Subodh Chandra Moitra started to give coaching with only 20 students, later on the name got spread all around the world and today we have students of SCM ATTI successfully serving the aviation industry as Aircraft Maintenance Engineers in India and abroad. The institution gives equal importance in both theoretical and practical oriented training. It has a vast set up of theoretical class room & Practical workshops, training facilities. S.C.Moitra Air Technical Training Institute is an approved college by the Directorate General of Civil Aviation (India). The college has two aircraft - Cessna 150D and Learjet 25D to impart practical knowledge to the students.

See also

References

External links
S.C.Moitra Air Technical Training Institute Official Website
List of DGCA approved Colleges in India
Official website WBSCTE

Technical universities and colleges in West Bengal
Educational institutions established in 1948
1948 establishments in West Bengal